A rat king is a rare phenomenon where a group of rats' tails become entangled.

Rat King or Ratking may also refer to:

Fictional characters
 Rat King (Teenage Mutant Ninja Turtles), in the Teenage Mutant Ninja Turtles multimedia franchise
 Rat King, in The Penguins of Madagascar
 Rat King, in The Amazing Maurice and his Educated Rodents

Other uses
 Ratking (novel), a 1988 novel by Michael Dibdin
 Ratking (group), a hip hop group from New York City
 Rat King, a 2012 Finnish thriller film by Petri Kotwica
 "The Rat King", 2015 season 5 episode 5 of Grimm
 , another English equivalent for the yakuza term

See also
 "The King of Rats", a short story prequel set in the world of the young adult trilogy The Sin Eater's Daughter by Melinda Salisbury
 King Rat (disambiguation)